The Greek Gods is an American yogurt company based in Seattle, Washington. Their products include Greek-style yogurt, kefir and lebni. The company was founded in 2003 and acquired by the Hain Celestial Group in 2010.

References

External links 
 

Brand name yogurts
Companies based in Seattle
Food and drink companies established in 2003
Dairy products companies of the United States
Yogurt companies
Greek-American culture in Washington (state)